Ruijs-Aalfs syndrome is a rare condition characterised by facial and skeletal abnormalities along with the development of hepatoma in the teenage years.

Signs and symptoms

The main features of this condition are evident in skeleton and face

Facial features:
 Triangular face
 Small frontotemporal diameter
 Small deep set eyes
 Bulbous nose with high nasal bridge
 Small upper lip
 Micrognathia

Skeletal features:
 Thoracic kyphoscoliosis
 Sloping shoulders
 Pectus excavatum
 Elbow contractures
 Clinodactyly
 Pes planus
 Delayed bone age

Other associated conditions:
 Lipodystrophy
 Simian creases

All three patients developed liver cancer (hepatoma) in the teens.

Genetics

This condition has been associated with mutations in the Spartan gene (SPRTN). This gene is located on the long arm of chromosome 1 (1q42.2).  The gene SPRTN encodes the DNA dependent metalloprotease Spartan.  Spartan is intimately involved in the repair of protein-linked DNA breaks.

Pathopysiology

This is not understood.

Diagnosis

This syndrome may be suspected on clinical grounds. The diagnosis is established by sequencing the SPRTN gene

Differential diagnosis
 Werner syndrome

Treatment

There is no specific treatment for this condition. Management is supportive.

Epidemiology

This condition is considered to be rare with only 3 cases reported in the literature.

History

This condition was first described in 2003.

References

Genetic diseases and disorders
Rare syndromes
Autosomal recessive disorders